Jeff Hardeveld (born 27 February 1995) is a Dutch professional footballer who plays as a left-back for Eredivisie club Emmen.

Club career
He signed for Heracles Almelo in July 2017.

On 29 June 2021, he moved to Emmen on a two-year contract with an option for the third year.

Personal life

In 2022, he started dating Dutch referee Shona Shukrula.

References

External links
Netherlands profile at Ons Oranje
vi.nl Voetbal International profile

1995 births
Footballers from Delft
Living people
Dutch footballers
Association football defenders
Netherlands youth international footballers
Netherlands under-21 international footballers
Feyenoord players
FC Utrecht players
Heracles Almelo players
FC Emmen players
Eredivisie players
Eerste Divisie players